Jefferson Academy may refer to:

Jefferson Academy Charter School, a charter school in Jefferson County, Colorado
Jefferson Academy (Monticello, Florida), a former school
Martin Institute, formerly known as Jefferson Academy in Jefferson, Georgia
Vincennes University, a university in Vincennes, Indiana formerly known as Jefferson Academy